George Mattson (November 20, 1908 – November 15, 1997) was an American rower. He competed in the men's coxless four event at the 1932 Summer Olympics.

References

External links
 

1908 births
1997 deaths
American male rowers
Olympic rowers of the United States
Rowers at the 1932 Summer Olympics
Rowers from Philadelphia